Judeopolonia, also Judeo-Polonia, is an antisemitic conspiracy theory positing future Jewish domination of Poland. The idea had its roots in an 1858 book by Julian Ursyn Niemcewicz, but did not gain currency in anti-semitic tracts until around 1900. In 1912, author Teodor Jeske-Choiński had Jews in his book rhetorically say: "If you do not allow us to establish a 'Judeo-Polonia state' and a nation of 'Judeo-Polish people,' we will strangle you."

This myth has been revived every so often in connection with the Bodenheimer plan (League of East European States), most notably by Andrzej Leszek Szcześniak in his books Judeopolonia (2001) and Judeopolonia II (2002).   writes that Szcześniak presents Jews as informers  for the tsar, "tightfisted hyenas" and arrogant  oppressors of the Polish people.

Szczęśniak gives the name of Judeopolonia to the League of East European States, a suggested German client state with autonomous Jewish cooperation, proposed for the territory between Germany and Russia by the Deutsches Komitee zur Befreiung der Russischen Juden in 1914.

See also
Andinia Plan
Żydokomuna

References

Antisemitism in Poland
Antisemitic canards
Conspiracy theories involving Jews